Judith Esseng Abolo (born 21 January 1979) is a Cameroonian former judoka. She competed in the women's half-lightweight event at the 2000 Summer Olympics.

References

External links
 

1979 births
Living people
Cameroonian female judoka
Olympic judoka of Cameroon
Judoka at the 2000 Summer Olympics
Place of birth missing (living people)